Emanuele Matteucci (born 26 January 2000) is an Italian professional footballer who plays as a centre back for  club Mantova.

Club career
Born in San Miniato, Matteucci started his career in Empoli youth sector. On 26 December 2019, he was an unused substitute in Serie B match against Cosenza.

On 10 August 2020, he was loaned to Serie C club Pontedera. Matteucci made his professional debut on 27 September against Olbia. On 23 July 2021, the club extended his loan.

On 16 July 2022, Matteucci signed with Mantova.

International career
Matteucci was a youth international for Italy.

References

External links
 
 

2000 births
Living people
People from San Miniato
Sportspeople from the Province of Pisa
Italian footballers
Association football central defenders
Serie C players
Empoli F.C. players
U.S. Città di Pontedera players
Mantova 1911 players
Italy youth international footballers
Footballers from Tuscany